Wyly is a surname. Notable people with the surname include:

Michael Wyly (born c. 1939), Colonel in the U.S. Marines
Sam Wyly (born 1934), American businessman
Charles Wyly (1933-2011) American businessman
L. D. Wyly (1916–2004), American scientist

See also
Dee and Charles Wyly Theatre, in Dallas, Texas
Wiley (disambiguation)
Whiley
Wily (disambiguation)
Wylie (disambiguation)
Wyllie
Willey (disambiguation)
Wylye (disambiguation)
Wyle (disambiguation)